Demas Akpore (August 4, 1928 – December 28, 1993) was the first elected Deputy Governor of Bendel State (1979–1983), the Principal of Government College, Ughelli, and the founder and principal of Orogun Grammar School.

Chief Demas Onoliobakpovba Akpore was born on 4 August 1928 at Warri, Nigeria into a Christian Family of Mr. Itedjere Akpore of Unukpo, Orogun in Ughelli North Local Government Area, Delta State of Nigeria, and Mrs. Etawhota Akpore (née Agbomiyeri) of Kokori in Ethiope East Local Government Area of Delta State. He was an only child of his mother and the first in a family of eight children.

Sources
Ahon, Festus Nigeria: "Immortalize Akpore, Activist Urges Delta Government" (Vanguard (Nigeria) 30 December 2008)
Akpore, Demas O. "The Question of the Falling Standard of Education: A Policy in Transition, The Nigerian Experience from An Educator's Viewpoint". (A lecture delivered on the occasion of the 1981 University of Ibadan Alumni Association Annual Lectures held at the University of Ibadan, Ibadan, 20 March 1981.
Akpoyibo, Marvel- Lagos State Police Commissioner "I never had a girlfriend in school because I was married to my books" (The Punch-Nigeria-By FRIDAY OLOKOR, Published:  20 December 2009)
 Awhefeada, Sunny. "Remembering Demas Akpore" (National Daily, Nigeria- 27 December 2008) 
Darra, G.G. "Urhobo and the Mowoe Legacy"(The Guardian, Nigeria-10 August 2005) Professor of English, Delta State University, Abraka/Special Adviser on Public Communications to the Governor of Delta State
Eromosele, Victor "Government College Ughelli at 60"(The Guardian, Nigeria 9 November 2005)
Olodu, Monn "Much Ado About Delta State Capital"
Omu, Stella "Demas Akpore" Administrator, Nigeria federal Ministry of Education.

References

1928 births
1993 deaths
Nigerian educators
National Council of Nigeria and the Cameroons politicians
Midwest Democratic Front politicians
Unity Party of Nigeria politicians
Nigerian Christians